Ruy Leme da Fonseca Filho (born June 9, 1973) is a Brazilian horse rider that competes in Eventing. He won four Pan American Games medals from 1995 to 2015. Fonseca competed in two Summer Olympics, London 2012 - finishing 42nd in individual and 9th in team eventing - and Rio 2016, where Fonseca was eliminated in the jumping qualifiers after his horse refused to jump and threw him off.

CCI 5* Results

International Championship Results

References

Brazilian male equestrians

Living people
1973 births
Olympic equestrians of Brazil
Sportspeople from São Paulo
Equestrians at the 2012 Summer Olympics
Equestrians at the 2016 Summer Olympics
Equestrians at the 1995 Pan American Games
Equestrians at the 2011 Pan American Games
Equestrians at the 2015 Pan American Games
Equestrians at the 2019 Pan American Games
Pan American Games gold medalists for Brazil
Pan American Games silver medalists for Brazil
Pan American Games bronze medalists for Brazil
Pan American Games medalists in equestrian
Medalists at the 2015 Pan American Games
Medalists at the 2019 Pan American Games
Medalists at the 2011 Pan American Games
20th-century Brazilian people
21st-century Brazilian people